Lena Grabowski (born 10 September 2002) is an Austrian swimmer. She competed in the women's 200 metre backstroke at the 2019 World Aquatics Championships. In 2021, she competed in the 2020 Olympics.

References

External links
 

2002 births
Living people
Place of birth missing (living people)
Austrian female backstroke swimmers
Swimmers at the 2020 Summer Olympics
Olympic swimmers of Austria
21st-century Austrian women